Yesin Ben Mohamadi (born 12 February 1996) is a Dutch football player of Moroccan descent who plays for GVV Unitas.

Club career
He made his professional debut in the Eerste Divisie for RKC Waalwijk on 9 September 2016 in a game against FC Dordrecht.

Ahead of the 2019-20 season, Mohamadi joined GVV Unitas.

References

External links
 

1996 births
Living people
Footballers from The Hague
Dutch sportspeople of Moroccan descent
Association football midfielders
Dutch footballers
Sparta Rotterdam players
RKC Waalwijk players
Eerste Divisie players